Xun Fangying (born 14 January 1995) is a Chinese tennis player.

On 24 February 2020, she reached her career-high singles ranking of world No. 167. On 8 April 2019, she peaked at No. 176 in the WTA doubles rankings.

Xun made her WTA Tour main-draw debut at the 2015 Guangzhou International Open, in the doubles competition, partnering Liu Fangzhou.

Performance timeline

Only main-draw results in WTA Tour, Grand Slam tournaments, Fed Cup/Billie Jean King Cup and Olympic Games are included in win–loss records.

Singles

ITF Circuit finals

Singles: 14 (7 titles, 7 runner–ups)

Doubles: 17 (7 titles, 10 runner–ups)

References

External links
 
 

1995 births
Living people
Chinese female tennis players
21st-century Chinese women